CART Fury Championship Racing, also known as simply CART Fury, is a 2000 open wheel-themed racing video game developed by Midway Games based on Championship Auto Racing Teams (CART). Originally released to arcades, a version was also released for the PlayStation 2.

Some of its famous drivers like Juan Pablo Montoya, Michael Andretti and Christian Fittipaldi are included in the game. The game features the voice of Danny Sullivan. While the arcade version has original soundtrack composed by Dan Forden, the PlayStation 2 version has licensed music by Disturbed and Outkast are used as the official soundtrack of this game.

Gameplay
Rather than a being a true simulation, CART Fury Championship Racing is an arcade racer, with traits like spectacular crashes, spinouts, speed-draining slides, and tailgating. It includes road courses, street courses and oval tracks. Three skill levels (Easy, Medium, and Hard) allow players of all ability levels to compete on equal terms against the AI-controlled opponents.

Drivers and teams

Tracks
 Chicago Motor Speedway
 Rio de Janeiro
 Airport Raceway
 Frankfurt
 Houston
 Long Beach, California
 Toronto
 Surfers Paradise
 A fictionalized version of Laguna Seca Raceway, branded as "California"
 The Skyway
 Road America
 Alpine Raceway
 The Big Dig
 Miami
The Moon
 New York City

Reception

The PlayStation 2 version received "mixed" reviews according to the review aggregation website Metacritic.

References

External links
 Arcade Flyers
 

2000 video games
Arcade video games
Champ Car video games
PlayStation 2 games
Racing video games set in the United States
Video games set in Canada
Multiplayer and single-player video games
Video games developed in the United States
Video games scored by Dan Forden
Midway video games